The 1940 United States Senate election in Vermont took place on November 5, 1940. Incumbent Republican Warren Austin successfully ran for re-election to another term in the United States Senate, defeating Democratic candidate Ona S. Searles. Austin would resign in August 1946 to become United States Ambassador to the United Nations; Ralph Flanders was appointed to replace him and went on to win election to a full term in 1946.

Republican primary

Candidates
Warren Austin, incumbent Senator since 1931

Results

Democratic primary

Candidates
Ona S. Searles, State Representative from Newport City

Results

General election

Results

See also 

 United States Senate elections, 1940 and 1941

References

Vermont
1940
1940 Vermont elections